Acrobasis tricolorella, the destructive prune worm or tricolored acrobasis moth, is a species of snout moth in the genus Acrobasis. It was described by Augustus Radcliffe Grote in 1878, and is known from southern Canada and northern United States. 

Adults are on wing from June to October.

The larvae feed on Prunus, Malus pumila, Prunus armeniaca, Sorbus americana, Rosa, Amelanchier and Heteromeles arbutifolia. They feed on buds and fruits of their host plant. The species overwinters in the larval stage.

References

Moths described in 1878
Acrobasis
Moths of North America